Georgi Iliev Rusev (7 May 1928 – 1 April 2011) was a Bulgarian actor. He created a gallery of colorful characters for a four-decade career, and became famous as a master of the so-called "second plan roles".

Biography and Career
Georgi Rusev was born on 7 May 1928 in the village of Kostenets, Sofia Province. In 1952 he graduated as an actor in Krastyo Sarafov National Academy for Theatre and Film Arts.

His professional debut is on the stage of the Plovdiv Theater as Aesop in the staging by Leon Daniel after the novel of the same name. In the following years he played on the stage of the Mladezhki Theater, Sofia and from 1966 until 1990, Rusev is a member of a theatrical company with the Pernik Theater being its leader from 1977. In 1990 he is among the founders of the Small City Theater "Zad Kanala", Sofia. Rusev also played roles for other theaters in Sofia in the years before his retiring. In 2006 he is honorary awarded with ASKEER, Bulgarian award of theater art.

Rusev's career in the film acting started comparatively late at the age of 38. He say that he had no interest in filming in those years. He became interested in cinema works after the first of Georgi Mishev's  screenplays were screened. As a result, Georgi Rusev created numerous colorful characters in some of the cult films in the Bulgarian cinema. Portraying usually roles of  small-minded persons, placed in the second plan around the main character, Rusev built up his own distinguishable style of acting.
By way of example it can be listed the films: The Hare Census, A Peasant on a Bicycle, Villa Zone, Ladies' Choice, Dangerous Charm not to mention his episodic appearance in A Nameless Band which turned into an illustrious allegory about the life folklore of the time.

Filmography

References
Bulgarian National Film Archive 
Actors Biography
Standart newspaper interview

External links
 

1928 births
2011 deaths
20th-century Bulgarian male actors
Bulgarian male stage actors
Bulgarian male film actors
People from Sofia Province